The Segunda Divisão Portuguesa (English: Portuguese Second Division) was a football league situated at the third level of the Portuguese football league system. The division had previously been the second level of the Portuguese pyramid but, with the creation of the Segunda Liga in 1990–91, it became the third level. The competition merged with the Terceira Divisão at the end of the 2012–13 to form a new enlarged third level league, the Campeonato Nacional de Seniores.

Format
In its last season, the league was split into three zonal divisions: Norte (North), Centro (Centre) and Sul (South). Each division was made up of 16 teams. The winners of each division were promoted.

The three regional divisions were the usual format of the league, but definition of the tier championship varied: Sometimes it was an elimination tournament with a final, and other times a final round-robin of the regional division winners. Other times there would be no single champion, and all three regional winners would be promoted without playing a final. This last option was used once the Segunda Divisão was no longer the actual second tier.

Seasons - League Tables

List of champions

Second-tier League: 1935–1990

Third-tier League: 1990–2013

Performances by club
Note: Years in italics indicate that the team was one of three declared Segunda Divisão champions.

References

External links
Official webpage 
ZeroZero Portuguese Second Division Stats And Tables
 Second Division Top Standings from Portuguese Soccer News Links

       
2
Defunct third level football leagues in Europe